The men's mass start race of the 2014–15 ISU Speed Skating World Cup 4, arranged in the Thialf arena in Heerenveen, Netherlands, was held on 14 December 2014.

Jorrit Bergsma of the Netherlands won the race, while Lee Seung-hoon of South Korea came second, and Fabio Francolini of Italy came third.

Results
The race took place on Sunday, 14 December, scheduled in the afternoon session, at 17:31.

References

Men mass start
4